Sidnei dos Reis Mariano (born 23 February 1986), known as Sidnei, is a Cape Verdean professional footballer who plays for Libolo in Angola, as a central midfielder.

Football career
Born in Praia, Sidnei made his professional debut in 2008 with Maritimo.

He made his international debut for Cape Verde in 2009.

External links
 
 

1986 births
Living people
Sportspeople from Praia
Footballers from Santiago, Cape Verde
Cape Verdean footballers
Association football midfielders
Primeira Liga players
C.R.D. Libolo players
C.S. Marítimo players
Segunda Divisão players
Liga Portugal 2 players
S.C. Beira-Mar players
Gil Vicente F.C. players
Cape Verde international footballers
Cape Verdean expatriate footballers
Expatriate footballers in Portugal
Expatriate footballers in Angola